The Oak Ridge Boys are an American country and gospel vocal quartet originating in Oak Ridge, Tennessee. The group was founded in the 1940s as the Oak Ridge Quartet. They became popular in Southern gospel during the 1950s. Their name was changed to the Oak Ridge Boys in the early 1960s, and they remained a gospel group until the mid-1970s, when they changed their image and concentrated on country music.

The lineup that produced their most well-known country and crossover hits ― such as "Elvira" (1981), "Bobbie Sue" (1982), and "American Made" (1983) ― consists of Duane Allen (lead vocals), Joe Bonsall (tenor), William Lee Golden (baritone), and Richard Sterban (bass). Golden and Allen joined the group in the mid-1960s, and Sterban and Bonsall joined in the early 1970s. Golden was removed from the group in 1987 and replaced by Steve Sanders until 1995, when he left and Golden rejoined.

The group was inducted into the Country Music Hall of Fame in 2015.

History

The Oak Ridge Quartet
The core group that would eventually lead to the Oak Ridge Boys was a country group called Wally Fowler and the Georgia Clodhoppers, formed in 1943 in Knoxville, Tennessee. They were requested to perform for staff members and their families restricted during World War II at the Oak Ridge National Laboratory in nearby Oak Ridge, Tennessee. They were asked to sing there so often that, eventually, they changed their name to the Oak Ridge Quartet, and because their most popular songs were gospel, Fowler decided to focus solely on Southern gospel music. At the time, the quartet was made up of Wally Fowler, Lon "Deacon" Freeman, Curly Kinsey, and Johnny New. This group began recording in 1947. Wally Fowler and the Oak Ridge Quartet were members of the Grand Ole Opry in the 1940s.  In 1949, the other three men split from Fowler to form a new group, Curley Kinsey and the Tennessee Ridge Runners, so Fowler hired an existing group, the Calvary Quartet, to reform the Oak Ridge Quartet. Walt Cornell sang baritone for the Oak Ridge Quartet in the early 1950s. In 1957, Fowler sold the rights to the "Oak Ridge Quartet" name to group member Smitty Gatlin in exchange for forgiveness of a debt. As a result of more personnel changes, the group lost its tenor, so they lowered their arrangements and had Gatlin sing tenor, while the pianist, Tommy Fairchild, sang lead. They recorded an album for Cadence Records, then in 1958, they hired Willie Wynn to sing the tenor part, and Fairchild moved back exclusively to the piano. At this point, the group consisted of Fairchild at the piano, Wynn, Gatlin (singing lead), baritone Ron Page, and bass Herman Harper. They recorded an album on the Checker Records label, one on Starday, and three on Skylite. In 1961, Gatlin changed the group's name to "the Oak Ridge Boys" because their producer, Bud Praeger, thought "Oak Ridge Quartet" sounded too old-fashioned for their contemporary sound.

1962–1973
In 1962, Ron Page left, and the group hired Gary McSpadden (who had filled in for Jake Hess in the Statesmen Quartet) as baritone with the understanding from Jake Hess that when he was ready to start a group, he would recruit McSpadden. They recorded another album on Skylite, and then two groundbreaking albums on Warner Bros. Records. When Hess followed through on that promise, McSpadden quit to join a new group Hess was forming, the Imperials. Jim Hammill (who later became a mainstay in the Kingsmen Quartet) was chosen to be his replacement. They made one album for Festival Records, one for Stateswood (Skylite's budget label), and two more for Skylite. Hammill did not get along with the rest of the group, and William Lee Golden, a newcomer to the music industry, felt that Hamill was hurting the group and asked the group if he could be Hammil's replacement. After Hamill's retirement from the group in 1964, Golden joined as baritone.

The group recorded another album for Starday and another on Skylite in 1965. In 1966, Gatlin left the group to become a minister of music, and on Golden's recommendation, Duane Allen, formerly of the Southernairs Quartet (and more recently baritone of the Prophets Quartet), was hired to replace him. With Willie Wynn still singing tenor and Herman Harper as bass, the group made another album for Skylite and one for United Artists, and then began recording on the Heart Warming label. Between 1966 and 1973, they made 12 albums with Heart Warming, and the company also released several compilation albums on which they were included during those years. The group also had an album on Vista (Heart Warming's budget label) that included unreleased songs from previous sessions. Harper left the group in 1968 to join the Don Light Talent Agency, before starting his own company, the Harper Agency, which remains one of the most reputable booking agencies in gospel music. Noel Fox, formerly of the Tennesseans and the Harvesters, took over the bass part. In 1970, the Oak Ridge Boys earned their first Grammy Award for "Talk About the Good Times".

In late October 1972, Richard Sterban, the bass with J. D. Sumner and the Stamps Quartet, left that group and joined the Oak Ridge Boys. The quartet that appeared on Hee Haw in 1972 consisted of Willie Wynn, Duane Allen, William Lee Golden, and Richard Sterban. Joe Bonsall, a Philadelphia native who was a member of the Keystone Quartet and recording on Duane Allen's Superior label, joined in April 1973. Sterban and Bonsall had both been in the Keystones during the late 1960s, recording much of the ORB's material. That same year, the Oak Ridge Boys recorded a single with Johnny Cash and the Carter Family, "Praise the Lord and Pass the Soup", that put them on the country charts for the first time. The group's lineup remained consistent for the next 15 years.

1974–1986
In the mid-1970s, the Oak Ridge Boys became involved with prominent country music promoter Jim Halsey, who as their new manager, began encouraging them to move from gospel music to broader country music—the most fundamental change in their history—and began arranging international appearances.

After opening a series of shows for Roy Clark, the group moved in 1973 to the Columbia label, for which they made three albums and several singles. In early 1976, they toured Russia for three weeks with Roy Clark. They went from being one of the top acts on Heart Warming to nearly the bottom on Columbia in terms of promotion. Columbia did not serve the gospel radio stations like Heart Warming did, leaving the impression that the Oak Ridge Boys were leaving gospel music, which hurt the group's popularity among its core fan demographic. While promoting the single "Heaven Bound", the Oak Ridge Boys made appearances on The Mike Douglas Show and The Merv Griffin Show, both nationally syndicated in the United States and Canada. In 1976, despite having been picked by Paul Simon to sing backup on "Slip Slidin' Away", the group asked to be released from its contract with Columbia after its single, "Family Reunion", was only a lukewarm success. Columbia complied with the request, and the band immediately made a live album that was a mix of gospel and country on their own label.

In 1977, the Oak Ridge Boys fully switched from gospel to country with the release of their first ABC Records (later absorbed by MCA) album, Y'all Come Back Saloon. Two songs from that album reached the top five on the country charts, and their next album, Room Service, in 1978, gave them two more, including their first number-one hit, "I'll Be True to You". The Oak Ridge Boys Have Arrived was released in 1979, and Together followed in 1980. A compilation album simply titled Greatest Hits, containing 10 singles from the previous four albums, was released in the fall of 1980. This same year, the Oak Ridge Boys also made a brief cameo appearance on The Dukes of Hazzard (season two, "Granny Annie").

The group's sixth album, Fancy Free, released early in 1981, contained the Dallas Frazier–penned song "Elvira". This remains the group's most widely known song, and Fancy Free is their best-selling album. "Elvira" had been recorded by other artists, including Frazier himself in the late 1960s and the First Edition in 1970, but the Oak Ridge Boys were the first to have a hit with it. Their version of the song was a number-one country hit, and in July 1981 reached number five on the pop charts.

The doo-wop-style title track from Bobbie Sue, their seventh album, was another crossover hit, reaching number one on the country charts and number 12 on the pop charts. That album also spawned the group's first U.S.-released music video, for the song "So Fine". (A video was made for "Easy", from the Y'All Come Back Saloon album, but was never released in the U.S.)  The group also recorded The Oak Ridge Boys Christmas album in 1982.

Their album American Made was released in January 1983. The title track was used as a TV advertisement for Miller Beer.

The group recorded three albums over the next three years. The late-1983 album Deliver provided two number-one singles, one of which, "I Guess It Never Hurts to Hurt Sometimes", was written by Randy VanWarmer, who had a hit in 1979 with "Just When I Needed You Most". Their next album was Greatest Hits 2, released in July 1984. Unlike the 1980 Greatest Hits album, this one included two new songs, "Everyday" and "Make My Life With You", both number-one country hits. In 1985, they released their 12th album, Step on Out. The title cut was written by ex-Byrd Chris Hillman and former Crawdaddy magazine editor Peter Knobler. The group recorded two albums in 1986, one of which was a second Christmas album, and in 1987, they recorded a single called "Take Pride in America", which was used in television public service announcements about recycling.

1987–1999

In 1987, Where The Fast Lane Ends was released. It was the first with new producer Jimmy Bowen, and was the group's last album before the 1987 departure of William Lee Golden. Golden was replaced by the band's guitarist, Steve Sanders.

The group released four more albums for MCA, including a third Greatest Hits album that contained a previously unreleased single they had recorded for the Take Pride In America campaign. They moved to RCA Nashville and made three albums there, including Best of the Oak Ridge Boys, which included a single they had made for the My Heroes Have Always Been Cowboys movie soundtrack. The move to RCA did not work out because the person who had signed them there moved to another label shortly thereafter, and his replacement wanted to promote Alabama more than the Oak Ridge Boys. They switched again and signed with Liberty Records, (Capitol's Nashville-based label), for which they made their third Christmas album.

Baritone Steve Sanders was replaced by Duane Allen's son, Dee, with occasional help from his brother-in-law Paul Martin. (Martin had previously replaced J.P. Pennington as lead singer of Exile in the early 1990s until that band's disbanding.) At midnight on New Year's Day 1996, at the Star Plaza Theatre in Merrillville, Indiana, Golden returned to the group. That year, they made a two-disc gospel set, Revival (their first full gospel album since 1976) with Leon Russell producing. This was sold on TV and later by the Oak Ridge Boys themselves at concerts and through the mail. In 1998, Sanders died by suicide.

Over the next few years, the group collaborated on an album with polka instrumentalist Jimmy Sturr and then made an album for Platinum Records called Voices.

2000–present

After nearly a decade of dealing with problems such as labels that had little interest in promoting The Oak Ridge Boys, studio breakdowns, and sluggish sales, the group's fortunes changed when they signed with Spring Hill Records in 2000. In the first four years of teaming with Dove Award-winning producer Michael Sykes, the quartet released a full-length gospel album (From The Heart), their fourth Christmas album (Inconvenient Christmas), a patriotic album (Colors), a bluegrass album (The Journey), and a quasi-compilation, titled Common Thread, containing newly recorded versions of older gospel songs, as well as material from 2004's The Journey. Another Christmas album, Christmas Cookies, followed in 2005. In 2006, the group completed the album, Front Row Seats, a return to mainstream country music with modern, aggressive arrangements and song selection. The project spawned a minor top-40 hit with "It's Hard to Be Cool in a Mini-Van".

In June 2007, they returned to their namesake, Oak Ridge, Tennessee. They were the featured performers at the Secret City Festival and were given a tour of the Y-12 National Security Complex's historic Calutrons (used to separate the uranium 235 for Little Boy, the first atomic bomb used in warfare). While there, a street was renamed the Oak Ridge Boys Way in their honor.
 
Also in 2007, the group appeared on Shooter Jennings' (son of Waylon Jennings) album The Wolf. This pairing  led to The Boys Are Back, released on May 19, 2009, and named for the title song written by Shooter Jennings. The project debuted at number 16 on the Billboard Top Country Albums Chart and number 77 on the Billboard Top 200. The album was produced by Dave Cobb, who was introduced to the group by Shooter Jennings. Reviews were mixed, but most praised the cover of "Seven Nation Army" by The White Stripes; 2010 was just as busy, including a cameo appearance on the History Channel show Pawn Stars episode "Packing Heat", which aired on December 13, 2010.

During the July 8, 2011, performance of the Friday Night Opry, Little Jimmy Dickens announced that the Oak Ridge Boys would become the newest members of the Grand Ole Opry, effective August 6, 2011.

In September 2011, the quartet released It's Only Natural through Cracker Barrel Old Country Store's music label. The album debuted at number 16 on the Billboard Country albums chart, remaining in the country top 40 for nearly two months. It contains 12 tracks - five new songs and seven re-recorded hits from the late 1980s. The first single off the album is "What-cha Gonna Do". A special 30th-anniversary re-recording of "Elvira" is featured on the album, as well.

In 2012, the group released two new studio albums. In May, they made a return to their Southern gospel roots with the release of Back Home Again. Along with gospel standards, the group covered John Denver's "Back Home Again" and Dolly Parton's "Coat of Many Colors". The album, featuring mostly acoustic arrangements, was produced by Ben Isaacs (of The Isaacs). In September of the same year, Christmas Time's A-Coming, the group's sixth Christmas project, was released through Gaither Music Group, and was also a featured title at Cracker Barrel Old Country Stores. The project features traditional standards, both secular and spiritual, as well as new material.

In 2013, The Oak Ridge Boys celebrated the 40th anniversary of the current lineup of members with a special 40th-Anniversary Tour, commemorative CD project, an Oak Ridge Boys-themed cruise, and a network television special.

The Oak Ridge Boys released their first-ever live hits album Boys Night Out in April 2014 through Cleopatra Records. In an interview, Joe Bonsall said, "Here it is live and kicking with the audience singing with us. It's totally updated and different. I think for our real fans, this is going to be a gigantic treat, because our fans have clamored for a live album for years, and for people who don't know us or don't know us as well, to listen to this makes them go, "Oh wow, these guys are still sounding great, holy cow." I think it's going to be a good project for us all around."

On August 21, 2015, they revealed a collaboration recording of their hit "Elvira". This collaboration was recorded with Sing-Off-winning, country a cappella group Home Free, who uploaded the video to their YouTube channel. The video was an instant hit, reaching 90,000 views within the first 20 hours of it being uploaded.

On October 25, 2015, the Oak Ridge Boys were inducted into the Country Music Hall of Fame during the Medallion Ceremony, in the category of modern-era artists. It was presented by Kenny Rogers (a previous inductee).

In 2017, the Oak Ridge Boys joined Third Day at the legendary FAME Studios in Muscle Shoals, Alabama, to record a cover version of Paul Simon's "Loves Me Like A Rock" for the Third Day album, Revival.

In December 2018, the Oak Ridge Boys attended the funeral of the 41st President of the United States, George H. W. Bush, in Houston, Texas, and sang "Amazing Grace" during the service.

On October 4, 2019, the Oak Ridge Boys announced their partnership with AARP and the U.S. Department of Justice to help raise awareness of elder fraud.

Discography

Personnel

William Lee Golden – baritone (1965–87; 1995–)
Duane Allen – lead (1966–)
Richard Sterban – bass (1972–)
Joe Bonsall – tenor (1973–)
Former

Curly Kinsey – bass (1945–47)
Lon "Deacon" Freeman – baritone/guitar (1945–49)
Wally Fowler – lead (1945–52)
Little Johnny New – tenor (1945–49; 1952)
Monroe (Curley) Blaylock – bass (1947–49)
Bob Weber – bass (1949–56)
Pat Patterson – baritone (1949–52), lead (1952–53)
Joe Allred – tenor (1949–52; 1962–54)
Bob Prather – baritone (1952)
Carlos Cook – lead (1952–53), baritone (1953–68)
Calvin Newton – lead (1953–56)
Cat Freeman – tenor (1954–56)
Les Roberson – baritone (1955–56)
Ron Page – bass (1956)
Bill Smith – bass (1957)
Ronnie Page – baritone (1957–62)
Smitty Gatlin – lead (1957–58; 1959–66), tenor (1958–59)
Hobert Evans – tenor (1957–58)
Wallace "Happy" Edwards – tenor fill-in (1958)
Bobby Clark – tenor (1958)
Tommy Fairchild – lead (1958–59)
Herman Harper – bass (1957–69)
Little Willie Wynn – tenor (1959–73)
Gary McSpadden – baritone (1962–63)
Big Jim Hamill – baritone (1963–64)
Noel Fox – bass (1969–72)
Steve Sanders – baritone (1987–95)
Dee Allen – baritone fill-in (late 1995)
Paul Martin – baritone fill-in (late 1995)

Band

Boyce Hawkins – piano (1949)
Bobby Whitfield – piano (1950–52; 1954–1956)
Glen Allred – guitar / vocals (1951–52)
Powell Hassell – piano (1957–58)
Tommy Fairchild – piano (1959–60; 1961–72)
Gary Trusler – piano (1960)
James Goss – piano (1960)
Mark Ellerbee – drums (1969–79)
Marty Twinkles Glisson – piano (1976 [?])
Don Breland – bass guitar (197?–87)
Skip Mitchell – guitar (1976–86)
Pete Cummings – lead guitar (1980-1983)
John Rich – guitar and steel (1972–75)
Tony Brown – piano and keyboards (1972–75)
Garland Craft – piano (1975–81)
Michael Saleem – drums (1979–80)
Fred Satterfield – drums (1980–96)
Paul Urick – bass guitar (1987–early 1990s [?])
Chris Nole – keyboard (2009–12)
Dewey Dorough – saxophone, harmonica (1982–2000)
Ron Fairchild – keyboard (1980–2001, 2002–09, fill-in 2009–12, 2013–present)
Chris Golden – acoustic guitar/mandolin (1995), drums (1996–2014)
Don Carr – lead guitar (1991–2014)
Jimmy Fulbright – keyboard (2001), bass guitar (2003–12)
Rex Wiseman – various instruments (2006–present)
Jeff Douglas – guitar and dobro (1995–2021)
Scotty Simpson – bass guitar (2013–present)
David Northup – percussion/drums (2014–2017)
Roger Eaton – lead guitar (2014–2021)
Austin Curcuruto – percussion/drums (2017–present)
James Watkins – lead guitar (2021)
Darin Favorite – lead guitar (2021-present)

Timeline

Awards and honors
Academy of Country Music Awards
1978: Top Vocal Group
1981: Single of the Year – "Elvira"

Country Music Association Awards
1978: Instrumental Group of the Year (Oak Ridge Boys Band)
1978: Vocal Group of the Year
1981: Single of the Year – "Elvira"
1986: Instrumental Group of the Year (Oak Ridge Boys Band)

GMA Dove Awards
1969: Album of the Year – It's Happening
1970: Male Group of the Year
1972: Male Group of the Year
1972: Album of the Year – Light
1973: Album of the Year – Street Gospel
2002: Country Album of the Year – From The Heart
2007: Country Song of the Year – "Jonah, Job and Moses"
2010: Long Form Music Video of the Year – A Gospel Journey

Grammy Awards
1971: Best Gospel Performance (other than soul) – "Talk About the Good Times"
1974: Best Gospel Performance (other than soul) – "Baptism of Jesse Taylor"
1977: Best Gospel Performance (other than soul) – "Where the Soul Never Dies"
1978: Best Traditional Gospel Performance – Just a Little Talk with Jesus
1982: Best Country Performance by a Duo or Group with Vocal – Elvira

Other honors
2000: Inducted into the Gospel Music Hall of Fame
2001: Received the Silver Buffalo award from the Boy Scouts of America
2015: Inducted into the Country Music Hall of Fame

References

External links
 
 
 'The Oak Ridge Boys' Vocal Group Hall of Fame page
 Oak Ridge Boys biography at the Country Music Television website
 Southern Gospel History: Oak Ridge Boys

1947 establishments in Tennessee
Country music groups from Tennessee
American gospel musical groups
Country Music Hall of Fame inductees
Gospel quartets
Grammy Award winners
Grand Ole Opry members
Music of East Tennessee
Musical groups established in 1947
MCA Records artists
RCA Records Nashville artists
Southern gospel performers
Starday Records artists
Vocal quartets